Winslow Lake is used for several lakes

 in Canada
 Winslow Lake (British Columbia)
 Winslow Lake (Manitoba)
 Winslow Lake (Ontario)
 in the USA
 Winslow Lake (Maine)
 Winslow Lake (Nebraska)
 Winslow Lake (Michigan)
 Winslow Lake (Wisconsin)
Winslow Lake (Washington)